Les Presses de l'Université de Montréal (PUM) is a university press founded in 1962 and associated with the University of Montreal. Les Presses de l'Université de Montréal is a member of the Association of Canadian University Presses.

See also

 List of university presses

References

External links 
Les Presses de l'Université de Montréal

Presses de l'Université de Montréal
University presses of Canada